Grezzana is a comune (municipality) in the Province of Verona in the Italian region Veneto, located about  west of Venice and about  northeast of Verona.

Grezzana borders the following municipalities: Bosco Chiesanuova, Cerro Veronese, Erbezzo, Negrar, Roverè Veronese, Sant'Anna d'Alfaedo, and Verona.

Demographic evolution

References

External links
 www.comune.grezzana.vr.it/

Cities and towns in Veneto